is a railway station in Kita-ku, Okayama, Okayama Prefecture, Japan. The station is operated by West Japan Railway Company (JR West).

Lines

Okayama Station is one of the major intersections of railways in the Chūgoku region. All trains connecting Honshū and Shikoku via the Great Seto Bridge originate and terminate here.

The station is served by the following JR West lines:
 Sanyō Shinkansen
 San'yō Main Line (including trains to Akō Line and Hakubi Line)
 Uno Line (Seto-Ōhashi Line)
 Tsuyama Line
 Kibi Line

In addition to the JR lines, a tram stop of the Okayama Electric Tramway named Okayama-Ekimae Station is located in front of the JR station.

Station Layout
The Shinkansen platforms are located on the 3rd level of the station and has 2 island platforms that serve 4 tracks, whilst the conventional lines on the ground floor have 4 island platforms that serve 10 tracks. All platforms. Platforms 5 and 7 are bay platforms near tracks 6 and 8. In 2004, the Tsuyama and Kibi Line platforms (Platforms 16 and 17 at the time) were moved over to the west side of Okayama Station due to renovations, and the shape and size of all platforms have changed since 2004.

The station building is one of the few stations whose front exit is the Shinkansen exit. It was converted to a bridge in October 2006, and its main functions, including Shinkansen communication, are installed on the second floor. In addition, the west exit station building was abolished due to the construction of the east-west connecting road, and the ticket gates were concentrated on the second floor and underground except for some. Many of the long concourses under the elevated tracks that once existed are now commercial facilities.

Adjacent Stations

History
The station opened on March 18, 1891. Between 1972 and 1975, the station was the western terminus of the Sanyō Shinkansen.

External links
 JR West station information 

Railway stations in Okayama Prefecture
Okayama
Sanyō Main Line
Sanyō Shinkansen
Railway stations in Japan opened in 1891
Stations of West Japan Railway Company